Population 5 years old and upward,
Language Used at home Everyday 2011

References

Notes

Indonesia culture-related lists
Indonesia